Ervine Carl Wenig (December 23, 1895 – September 25, 1959) was an American football end who played three seasons in the National Football League (NFL) for the Rock Island Independents.

Early life and education
Wenig was born on December 23, 1895, in Inwood, Iowa. He attended high school in Inwood, before graduating in 1914. He enrolled at Morningside University in fall of that year, and played on the football, baseball, basketball, and track teams.

In 1916, during a 112–0 football win over Dakota Wesleyan, Wenig made a 50-yard drop kick, the "longest one ever made in a game in Sioux City." A report by The Wayne Herald following another 100-point win said the following:

In the 1916 baseball season, Wenig, a left-handed pitcher, did not lose a game, and led his team to numerous shutouts.

In May 1917, Wenig was named team captain in track, but enlisted in the Army for World War I before getting a chance to captain the team.

Wenig also briefly played "phenomenal ball" for several minor league baseball teams that year.

With the Army in World War I, Wenig served overseas in the 88th division before returning to Morningside in 1919. He was named team captain in football upon returning, and led them to a 5–2 record. Following the season, he was named All-American by Walter Camp.

In basketball, Wenig was named honorable mention all-state at the end of the 1919–1920 season.

Professional career
In 1920, Wenig briefly played baseball for the "Armours," before suffering an injury that ended his baseball career.

Prior to a game against the Decatur Staleys, the Rock Island Independents of the American Professional Football Association (APFA) signed Wenig to play end and tackle. Wenig played just one game during the season, as starting left end in the Staleys-Independents matchup, a 0–0 tie. Despite just appearing in one game during the season, he was named second-team All-Pro by sportswriter Bruce Copeland, who was noted for his bias in favor of the Rock Island team.

Wenig returned to the Independents for the 1921 season, playing in seven games, starting six, and making three touchdowns and eight extra points.

In 1922, Wenig accepted a position as football coach at Mapleton High School, and The Daily Times reported that he was "definitely out of the game for the year" due to his coaching contract. Despite this, he returned to Rock Island mid-season for their game against the Chicago Bears, stating that "thoughts of the game [the previous year against the Bears] stirred him so much he could not help but return." He played in the game against the Bears, a loss, and remained with the Independents for the rest of the season, as they placed fifth in league standings with a 4–2–1 record. Wenig retired after the season.

Later life and death
In 1922, while playing for Rock Island, Wenig was named a coach at Mapleton High School. He also coached football, basketball, and track at his alma mater of Morningside University.

Wenig was married to Lucile Waterhouse in June 1924. He later became a golfer, and was Sioux City champion for a time.

Wenig was inducted into the Morningside Athletic Hall of Fame in 1956.

Wenig later became an FBI agent. He died on September 25, 1959, at the age of 63, due to a heart attack.

References

1895 births
1959 deaths
Players of American football from Iowa
American football ends
American football tackles
Baseball pitchers
Morningside Mustangs baseball players
Morningside Mustangs football players
Morningside Mustangs men's basketball players
Rock Island Independents players